Charo is the stage name of María Rosario Pilar Martínez Molina Baeza, a Spanish-American entertainment personality.

Charo may also refer to:

Charo (name), a given name, nickname or surname
Charo Municipality, a Mexican locale
Cerro de Charo, a hill in Spain

See also

Charro
Charos Kayumova
Chiro (disambiguation)
Chao (disambiguation)
Chapo (disambiguation)
Charlo (disambiguation)
Charm (disambiguation)
Chart (disambiguation)
Chiro (disambiguation)